Elections to Liverpool Town Council were held on Saturday 1 November 1878. One third of the council seats were up for election, the term of office of each councillor being three years.

Seven of the sixteen wards were uncontested.

After the election, the composition of the council was:

Election result

Given the significant number of uncontested wards, these statistics should be read in that context.

Ward results

* - Retiring Councillor seeking re-election

Abercromby

Castle Street

Everton

Exchange

Great George

Lime Street

North Toxteth

Pitt Street

Rodney Street

St. Anne Street

St. Paul's

St. Peter's

Scotland

South Toxteth

Vauxhall

West Derby

By-elections

No. 9, Great George

Caused by John Hampden Jackson (Liberal, Great George, elected 1 November 1878) ceasing to be a Councillor.

No. 13, St. Anne Street

Caused by Thomas Hayes Sheen (Conservative, St. Anne Street, elected 1 November 1878) ceasing to be a Councillor.

See also

 Liverpool City Council
 Liverpool Town Council elections 1835 - 1879
 Liverpool City Council elections 1880–present
 Mayors and Lord Mayors of Liverpool 1207 to present
 History of local government in England

References

1878
1878 English local elections
1870s in Liverpool